Jiang Qian (1876–1942), courtesy name Yiyuan,  art name Yangfu, was an influential Chinese scholar and educator.

Biography
In his early years, Jiang studied at the Ziyang Academy in Huizhou, Anhui, and Wenzheng Academy in Nanjing. In 1902 he helped Zhang Jian to found Tongzhou Normal School, the first Chinese normal school, and then became the school's president. In 1914, he was appointed the president of Nanking Higher Normal School, on the site of former Liangjiang Higher Normal School. Nanking Higher Normal School later turned to be National Southeastern University and renamed National Central University and Nanjing University. In 1918 when taken ill, he nominated the provost Kuo Ping-Wen to be the acting president. A year later in 1919, he quit the post of school president.

Chinese scholars
Presidents of National Central University
Presidents of Nanjing University
1876 births
1942 deaths
People from Shangrao